The list of ship launches in 2005 includes a chronological list of ships launched in 2005.


See also

References

2005
Ship launches